Jenisch House (Jenisch-Haus) is a  country house in Hamburg built in the 19th century and an example of Hanseatic lifestyle and neoclassical architecture. As of 2008, Jenisch House is the home of the Museum für Kunst und Kultur an der Elbe. It is located within the Jenisch park in the Othmarschen quarter.

History
The house was built by Franz Forsmann and Karl Schinkel for Martin Johann Jenisch between 1831 and 1834. Jenisch used it as a country house.

Location

The park was landscaped by Caspar Voght as a model farm and arboretum about 1800. It is located in the former independent locality of Klein Flottbek, now part of the Othmarschen quarter of Hamburg with a view toward the Elbe river, often described as "magnificent".

In 1828 Jenisch bought the farm and gardens from Voght and redesigned the area with the construction of his house.

Jenisch Park participated in the Tag des offenen Denkmals, a national annual event of the Deutsche Stiftung Denkmalschutz, opening cultural heritage sites to the public, in 2007 and 2008.

Architecture
The house is designed as a large cube, with a basement, two main floors and an attic floor. The windows are in a 1-3-1 ratio and focus on the center. On the main floors the windows reach almost completely from the floor to the ceiling. The front of the house toward the park and Elbe river has a Doric portico, supporting a balcony. The large windows, the balcony, and the house opening into the park represent the relationship between architecture and nature.

Functions
The ground floor has prestigious salons, while the first floor contained the living areas and the attics were for the servants. As of 2008, the Museum für Kunst und Kultur an der Elbe is located in Jenisch House, using it for exhibitions, marriages and other events. A terrace is occupied by a café for the museum.

Neighborhood

Jenisch House is located on the park's west side at Baron-Voght-Straße, a small residential street, and off Elbchaussee. The park itself reaches all the way down to the right bank of the Elbe river, at the other end somewhere near the Botanischer Garten Hamburg.

The Elbchaussee has many listed buildings; Jenisch House and Park are listed as well.

The Ernst Barlach House, located in the park, is a museum for the work of the expressionist sculptor, printmaker and writer Ernst Barlach (1870–1938).

See also

 List of castles in Hamburg
 List of museums and cultural institutions in Hamburg

References

External links
Website of the museum. Retrieved 2009-08-26. 
Virtual tour of the Jenisch House provided by Google Arts & Culture

Houses completed in 1834
Heritage sites in Hamburg
Neoclassical architecture in Germany
Museums in Hamburg
Buildings and structures in Altona, Hamburg
Historic house museums in Germany
Art museums and galleries in Germany
Manor houses in Germany